Caio Rodrigues Pumputis (born January 8, 1999 in São Paulo) is a Brazilian swimmer.

International career

2018-2020
On 28 August 2018, at the José Finkel Trophy (short course competition), he broke the South American record in the 100m medley, with a time of 51.83.

At the 2018 FINA World Swimming Championships (25 m) in Hangzhou, China, he obtained his first finals in World Championships, finishing 5th in the Men's 200 metre individual medley and 8th in the Men's 100 metre individual medley. He also finished 14th in the Men's 200 metre breaststroke.

At the 2019 World Aquatics Championships in Gwangju, South Korea, he finished 23rd in the Men's 200 metre individual medley, and was disqualified at the Men's 200 metre breaststroke.

At the 2019 Pan American Games held in Lima, Peru, Pumputis competed with a groin injury that significantly disrupted his performance, but even so, he won a silver medal in the Men's 200 metre individual medley., and finished 11th in the Men's 200 metre breaststroke.

2020 Summer Olympics
At the 2020 Summer Olympics in Tokyo, Pumputis finished 19th in the Men's 200 metre individual medley and 34th in the Men's 100 metre breaststroke

2021-2024
Pumputis competed at the collegiate level for Georgia Tech.

At the 2021 FINA World Swimming Championships (25 m), in Abu Dhabi, United Arab Emirates, he finished 4th in the Men's 4 × 100 metre medley relay, 8th in the Men's 200 metre breaststroke final, 10th in the Men's 200 metre individual medley 14th in the Men's 100 metre individual medley and helped Brazil to go to the Men's 4 × 50 metre medley relay final.

At the 2022 World Aquatics Championships held in Budapest, Hungary, he finished 19th in the Men's 200 metre breaststroke and was disqualified at the Men's 200 metre individual medley.

At the 2022 FINA World Swimming Championships (25 m), in Melbourne, Australia, he went to the Men's 200 metre breaststroke final, where he was disqualified. He also finished 11th in the Men's 100 metre breaststroke and in the Men's 100 metre individual medley, 15th in the Men's 200 metre individual medley and was disqualified in the Men's 4 × 50 metre medley relay.

References

External links

Living people
Brazilian male medley swimmers
World record holders in swimming
Medalists at the FINA World Swimming Championships (25 m)
Brazilian male breaststroke swimmers
1999 births
Swimmers from São Paulo
Pan American Games medalists in swimming
Pan American Games silver medalists for Brazil
Swimmers at the 2019 Pan American Games
Medalists at the 2019 Pan American Games
Swimmers at the 2020 Summer Olympics
Olympic swimmers of Brazil
Georgia Tech Yellow Jackets men's swimmers
21st-century Brazilian people
Competitors at the 2022 South American Games
South American Games gold medalists for Brazil
South American Games silver medalists for Brazil
South American Games medalists in swimming